Church on the Rock Theological Seminary is a Pentecostal Bible college in Bheemunipatnam, India.

History 
The seminary was founded in 1982 by Dr. P.J. Titus.

Affiliations and Accreditation 
It is accredited by the Asia Theological Association, the National Association of Theological Accreditation International Council for Higher Education in Zurich, Switzerland, and the International Council for Higher Education.

References

Bible colleges
Pentecostalism in Asia
Christian seminaries and theological colleges in India
Christianity in Andhra Pradesh
Universities and colleges in Visakhapatnam
Educational institutions established in 1982
1982 establishments in Andhra Pradesh